The United States Hockey League began in 1961 as a semi-professional ice hockey league.  Starting with the 1979–80 season, the league became a strictly Amateur league, and began awarding its champion the Clark Cup Trophy. All champions of the USHL are highlighted in this page.

Clark Cup
The Clark Cup is the current trophy awarded annually to the winner of the United States Hockey League Tier 1 Junior Hockey playoff champions.  The Clark Cup was named in honor of Don Clark, the long-time registrar of the Minnesota Amateur Hockey Association.  Clark was also the recipient of the NHL's Lester Patrick Trophy for his contributions to hockey in the United States.  The Clark Cup is one of two trophies that can be won by any team in a given year, with the other being the Anderson Cup which is awarded to the team with the most points in the standings at the end of the regular season.

USHL Champions

Semi-Pro Era (1961–79)

Junior Era (1979–present)
List of champions:

Championships by team

Teams marked in italics are no longer in the United States Hockey League

Clark Cup MVPs
 1998 – Nate Mauer, F, Omaha
 1999 – Pete Fregoe, F, Des Moines
 2000 – Aaron Smith, F, Green Bay
 2001 – Ray Fraser, G, Omaha
 2002 – Andy Franck, G, Sioux City
 2003 – Danny Irmen, F, Lincoln
 2004 – Kevin Regan, G, Waterloo
 2005 – Alex Stalock, G, Cedar Rapids
 2006 – Kyle Okposo, F, Des Moines
 2007 – Matt Lundin, G, Sioux Falls
 2008 – Drew Palmisano, G, Omaha
 2010 – Anders Lee, F, Green Bay
 2011 – Matt Morris, G, Dubuque
 2012 – Sam Herr, F, Green Bay
 2013 – Mike Szmatula, F, Dubuque
 2014 – Jason Pawloski, G, Indiana
 2015 – Troy Loggins, F, Sioux Falls
 2016 – Wade Allison, F, Tri-City
 2017 – Eduards Tralmaks, F, Chicago
 2018 – Griffin Loughran, F, Fargo
 2019 – Jaxson Stauber, G, Sioux Falls
 2021 – Adam Fantilli, F, Chicago
 2022 – Alex Tracy, G, Sioux City

References

United States Hockey League trophies and awards